This article presents a list of the historical events and publications of Australian literature during 2014.

Major publications

Literary fiction
 Belinda Alexandra - Sapphire Skies
 Emily Bitto – The Strays
 Peter Carey – Amnesia
 Elizabeth Harrower – In Certain Circles
 Sonya Hartnett – Golden Boys
 Janette Turner Hospital – The Claimant
 Wendy James – The Lost Girls
 Sofie Laguna – The Eye of the Sheep
 Joan London – The Golden Age
 Suzanne McCourt – The Lost Child
 Gerald Murnane – A Million Windows
 Omar Musa – Here Come the Dogs
 Favel Parrett – When the Night Comes
 Christine Piper – After Darkness
 Craig Sherborne – Tree Palace
 Inga Simpson – Nest
 Graeme Simsion – The Rosie Effect
 Rohan Wilson – To Name Those Lost

Children's and Young Adult fiction

 Trace Balla – Rivertime
 Karen Foxlee – Ophelia and the Marvellous Boy
 Morris Gleitzman – Loyal Creatures
 Kerry Greenwood – Gallipoli (illustrated by Annie White)
 Andy Griffiths – The 52-Storey Treehouse
 Darren Groth – Are You Seeing Me?
 Rebecca James – Cooper Batholomew is Dead
 Ambelin Kwaymullina – The Lost Girl
 Alison Lester – Noni the Pony Goes to the Beach
 Rebecca Lim – The Astrologer's Daughter
 Doug MacLeod – Tigers on the Beach
 John Marsden – South of Darkness
 Alice Pung – Laurinda
 Diana Sweeney – The Minnow
Claire Zorn – The Protected

Crime

 Honey Brown – Through the Cracks
 Katherine Howell – Deserving Death
 Barry Maitland – Crucifixion Creek
 P. M. Newton – Beams Falling
 Malla Nunn – Present Darkness
 Michael Rowbotham – Life or Death

Science Fiction and Fantasy

 Trudi Canavan – Thief's Magic
 Kate Forsyth – Wolves of Witchwood
 Patrick Holland – Navigato
 Juliet Marillier – The Cracks in the Kingdom
 Garth Nix – Clariel
 Matthew Reilly – The Great Zoo of China
 John A. Scott – N

Drama

 Michael Gow – Once in Royal David's City
 Daniel Keene – The Long Way Home

Poetry

 Judith Beveridge – Devadatta's Poems
 Lesbia Harford – Collected Poems : Lesbia Harford (edited by Oliver Dennis)
 Gwen Harwood – The Best 100 Poems of Gwen Harwood
 John Kinsella – Sack
 Geoffrey Lehmann – Poems 1957–2013
 Jennifer Maiden – Drones and Phantoms
 David Malouf – Earth Hour
 Chris Wallace-Crabbe – My Feet are Hungry

Biographies

 Bob Brown – Optimism : Reflections on a Life of Action
 Phil Butterss – An Unsentimental Bloke : The Life and Works of C. J. Dennis
 Matthew Condon – Jacks and Jokers
 Robert Dessaix – What Days Are For
 Rafael Epstein – Prisoner X
 Julia Gillard – My Story
 Dino Hodge – Don Dunstan : Intimacy and Liberty : A Political Biography
 John Howard – The Menzies Era : The Years that Shaped Modern Australia
 Madonna King – Hockey : Not your average Joe
 Elizabeth Morrison – David Syme : Man of the Age
 Mandy Sayer – The Poet's Wife
 David Walsh – A Bone of Fact

Non-fiction
 Paul Barry – Breaking News : Sex, lies & the Murdoch succession
 Sophie Cunningham – Warning: The Story of Cyclone Tracy
 Paul Kelly – Triumph and Demise: The Broken Promise of a Labor Generation
 Bruce Pascoe – Dark Emu

Awards and honours

Note: these awards were presented in the year in question.

Lifetime achievement

Fiction

International

National

Children and Young Adult

National

Crime and Mystery

National

Science Fiction

Non-Fiction

Poetry

Drama

Deaths

 14 February – Marshall Browne, novelist (born 1935)
 10 April – Doris Pilkington Garimara, novelist (born c.1937)
 17 July – Liam Davison, novelist and critic (born 1957)
19 September – Rod Milgate, playwright and painter (born 1934)
 8 October – Morris Lurie, novelist (born 1938)
3 November – Michael Fitzgerald Page, writer and publisher (born 1922)

See also
 Literature in 2014
 List of years in Australian literature
 List of Australian literary awards

References

Note: all references relating to awards can, or should be, found on the relevant award's page.

Literature
Australian literature by year
Years of the 21st century in Australia 
Years of the 21st century in literature